James Joseph Walsh (May 22, 1858 – May 8, 1909) was a U.S. Representative from New York.

Born in New York City, Walsh attended the public schools and St. James' Parochial School.
He was graduated from Manhattan College in 1877 and from the law department of Columbia University, both in New York City, in 1879.
He was admitted to the bar in 1880 and commenced practice in New York City.
He served as inspector of common schools 1889–1894.
Presented credentials as a Democratic Member-elect to the Fifty-fourth Congress and served from March 4, 1895, to June 2, 1896, when he was succeeded by John M. Mitchell, who had contested his election.
He resumed the practice of law in New York City.
He was appointed city magistrate in 1905, which office he held until his death in New York City on May 8, 1909.
He was interred in Calvary Cemetery, Woodside, New York.

Sources

1858 births
1909 deaths
Burials at Calvary Cemetery (Queens)
Manhattan College alumni
Democratic Party members of the United States House of Representatives from New York (state)
19th-century American politicians